Tao Luna (born February 11, 1974, in Shanghai) is a female Chinese sports shooter who competed in the 2000 Summer Olympics and in the 2004 Summer Olympics. In 2000, she won the gold medal in the women's 10 metre air pistol competition and the silver medal in the women's 25 metre pistol competition.

Olympic results

Records

External links
 Profile on ISSF website

1974 births
Living people
ISSF pistol shooters
Olympic gold medalists for China
Olympic shooters of China
Olympic silver medalists for China
Sport shooters from Shanghai
Shooters at the 2000 Summer Olympics
Shooters at the 2004 Summer Olympics
World record holders in shooting
Olympic medalists in shooting
Asian Games medalists in shooting
Shooters at the 1998 Asian Games
Shooters at the 2002 Asian Games
Shooters at the 2006 Asian Games
Chinese female sport shooters
Medalists at the 2000 Summer Olympics
Asian Games gold medalists for China
Asian Games silver medalists for China
Medalists at the 1998 Asian Games
Medalists at the 2002 Asian Games
Medalists at the 2006 Asian Games